The Men's shot put athletics events for the 2020 Summer Paralympics took place at the Tokyo National Stadium from August 27 to September 4, 2021. A total of 16 events were contested in this discipline.

Schedule

Medal summary
The following is a summary of the medals awarded across all shot put events.

Results

F11
Records

Prior to this competition, the existing world, Paralympic, and area records were as follows:

Results

The final in this classification took place on 30 August 2021, at 19:46:

F12
Records

Prior to this competition, the existing world, Paralympic, and area records were as follows:

Results

The final in this classification took place on 28 August 2021, at 9:35:

F20
Records

Prior to this competition, the existing world, Paralympic, and area records were as follows:

Results

The final in this classification took place on 31 August 2021, at 19:05:

Villalba, Hodgetts and Zolkefli were disqualified for arriving late to the call room. They were allowed to compete, but were marked as DNS (Did Not Start). Zolkefli's best distance of 17.94m was further than the winner's.

F32
Records

Prior to this competition, the existing world, Paralympic, and area records were as follows:

Results

The final in this classification took place on 31 August 2021, at 19:19:

F33
Records

Prior to this competition, the existing world, Paralympic, and area records were as follows:

Results

The final in this classification took place on 4 September 2021, at 19:05:

F34
Records

Prior to this competition, the existing world, Paralympic, and area records were as follows:

Results

The final in this classification took place on 4 September 2021, at 9:35:

F35
Records

Prior to this competition, the existing world, Paralympic, and area records were as follows:

Results

The final in this classification took place on 2 September 2021, at 19:58:

F36
Records

Prior to this competition, the existing world, Paralympic, and area records were as follows:

Results

The final in this classification took place on 31 August 2021, at 10:53:

F37
Records

Prior to this competition, the existing world, Paralympic, and area records were as follows:

Results

The final in this classification took place on 27 August 2021, at 19:53:

F40
Records

Prior to this competition, the existing world, Paralympic, and area records were as follows:

Results

The final in this classification took place on 29 August 2021, at 10:53:

F41
Records

Prior to this competition, the existing world, Paralympic, and area records were as follows:

Results

The final in this classification took place on 30 August 2021, at 10:08:

F46
Records

Prior to this competition, the existing world, Paralympic, and area records were as follows:

Results

The final in this classification took place on 1 September 2021, at 10:33:

F53
Records

Prior to this competition, the existing world, Paralympic, and area records were as follows:

Results

The final in this classification took place on 29 August 2021, at 9:35:

F55
Records

Prior to this competition, the existing world, Paralympic, and area records were as follows:

Results

The final in this classification took place on 27 August 2021, at 19:00:

F57
Records

Prior to this competition, the existing world, Paralympic, and area records were as follows:

Results

The final in this classification took place on 3 September 2021, at 19:10:

F63
Records

Prior to this competition, the existing world, Paralympic, and area records were as follows:

Results

The final in this classification took place on 4 September 2021, at 19:44:

References

Athletics at the 2020 Summer Paralympics
2021 in men's athletics